The 2013 Atlantic Sun Conference baseball tournament was held at Melching Field at Conrad Park on the campus of Stetson University in DeLand, Florida, from May 22 through 25.   won their first tournament championship and claimed the Atlantic Sun Conference's automatic bid to the 2013 NCAA Division I baseball tournament.  The Buccaneers joined the conference in 2005.

Format and seeding
The 2013 tournament was an 8-team double-elimination tournament.  The top eight teams (based on conference results) from the conference earned invitations to the tournament.  Northern Kentucky was not eligible for the tournament while it was reclassifying from Division II.  Kennesaw State claimed the sixth seed over Lipscomb by tiebreaker.

Bracket and results

 * Game went to extra innings

All-Tournament Team
The following players were named to the All-Tournament Team.

Most Valuable Player
Kerry Doane was named Tournament Most Valuable Player.  Doane was a pitcher for East Tennessee State.

References

ASUN Conference Baseball Tournament
Tournament
Atlantic Sun Conference baseball tournament
Atlantic Sun baseball tournament
Baseball in Florida
College sports in Florida